Lala Mnatsakanyan (born 8 October 1957) is an Armenian actress and Honoured Artist of Armenia.

Biography 
Born in Yerevan, Armenia, Lala Mnatsakanyan is the third and youngest daughter in the family.  Her mother Elza Gyuleseryan was an associate professor of scenic word at Yerevan Institute of Theater and Fine Arts.  Her father Babken Mnatsakanyan was a mathematician and a candidate of physico-mathematical science.

After graduating from school N78, Lala Mnatsakanyan entered the Yerevan Institute of Theater and Fine Arts.  In 1978, she graduated from the Faculty of Acting, receiving a diploma with honors.

She has played many diverse roles in theatre, film, and television, and has performed many roles in various theatres of the country–The Yerevan Youth Experimental Theatre, The Vanadzor State Drama Theatre (named after Hovhannes Abelyan), The Sundukyan State Academic Theatre of Yerevan, The “Metro” Theatre, and The “Mher Mkrtchyan” Artistic Theatre.  She is a scriptwriter and performer of 140 miniatures.  She has been a professor of scenic word at Yerevan State Institute of Theatre and Cinematography from 1991 to the present.  Mnatsakanyan is a co-author of the first and to-date only tutorial “The Art of Teaching Scenic Word” written in Armenian.

Theatrical Roles

Yerevan Institute of Theater and Fine Arts 

1975 – Smeraldina “Servant of Two Masters” Carlo Goldoni

1976 – Augustina “Eight Women” Robert Thomas

1978 – Giza “King Arlequin” Rudolf Lothar

The Yerevan Youth Experimental Theatre 

1979–80 – Rosalia Pavlovna “The Bedbug” Vladimir Mayakovsky

1979–80 – Mezalyapsova “The Bathhouse” Vladimir Mayakovsky

1979–80 – Gertrude “William Tell Has Sad Eyes” Alfonso Sastre

1979 – Polly “The Threepenny Opera” Bertolt Brecht

1979–80 – Sonya “Uncle Vanya” Anton Chekhov

1980 – Lika “Two sisters” Armen Zurabov

1984 – Vera “The bench” Alexander Gelman

The Vanadzor State Drama Theatre named after Hovhannes Abelyan 
1982– Armine “Beroyan family” Zhora Sarksyan

1982 – Anahit “Horovel” Gevorg Sarksyan

The Gabriel Sundukyan National Academic Theatre

1983 – Marina "Finding Joy" Viktor Rozov

1983 – Princess “The Twelve months” Samuil Marshak

1986 – Presenter “Blue Horses on Red Grass”  Mikhail Shatrov

1987 – Ninuccia “Christmas at the Cupiello's” Eduardo De Filippo

1989 – Lisa “Save our souls” Anahit Aghasaryan

1991 – Sorrentino “Widows’ Comforter” G. Marotta and B. Randone

The “Metro” Theatre

1995 – Eva “Ungrateful men” ("Love till death") Aldo Nicolaj

1995–96 – Mary “Willy, Titi, Jig” Anahit Aghasaryan

The “Mher Mkrtchyan” Artistic Theatre

2004 – Graciela “Love rebuff to the man sitting in armchair” Gabriel García Márquez

2009 – Filumena “Filumena Marturano” Eduardo De Filippo

The Theatre of Yerevan State Institute of Theatre and Cinematography 
2012 – Mother “The Mother” Karel Čapek

TV performances 

1982–83 – Lusik “Barsegh aga and others” Hagop Baronian

1983 – Policeman “Brave Nazar” L. Miridzhanyan

1984 – Janet “In the name of land and sun” Ion Druţă

1984 – Mary “God help us” Jackson

1984 – Masha "Look, who's come!" Vladimir Arro

1984 – Varya “Anton and Others” Aleksei Kazantsev

1986 – Hasmik “Aralez” Aghasi Ayvazyan

1989 – Nargiz “Leaven” Avetis Aharonyan

1994 – Vera “The bench” Alexander Gelman

Radio performances 

1983 – Hasmik “Peak of courage” Lalayants

1983 – Anna “Groom from forest” Hrachya Kochar

1983 – Nene “The Memoir of A Cross-Stealer” Raffi

1984 – Gladiator “Stranger” Chalikyan

1984 – Dulcinea del Toboso “Don Quixote” Miguel de Cervantes

1986–87 – Prince “The Prince and the Pauper” Mark Twain

1991 – Swan “The Laughing Matter” William Saroyan

TV programs 

1992–97 – Comic miniatures

1992–97 – “Voice of the Greats”

TV movies 

1996 – Lala “Our yard 1”

1997 – Seller at flower store “Favourite songs 1”

1998 – Café owner “Favourite songs 2”

2005 – Lala “Our yard 3”

Production

Performances 

2000 – “Fairy tales” Hovhannes Tumanyan

2001 – “Prometheus Bound” Aeschylus

2002 – “Musical Farce” Lala Mnatsakanyan

2007 – “Funny miniatures” Hagop Baronian

2012 – “The Mother” Karel Čapek

Authoress TV program 

1997 – “You bet” Comedy program

1998–2001 – “What’s new?” Comedy musical program

2002–2003 – “Lala & Harut” Comedy program

2004–2007 – “To be continued” TV serials-miniatures

Yeralash “Gzhuk” comedy TV show 

2008 – “No lie, No truth”

2008 – “The Master and Margarita”

2009 – “Hidden talent”

2010 – “Football”

2011 – “The Present”

National Cinema Center of Armenia

Prizes and awards 

1977 – First award for the republican competition of readers

1978 – All-union competition of masters of artistic word named after Yakhontov

2004 – International festival of mono-performances “Armmono2” – award in nomination “Artistic skills” for Gabriel Garcia Marques play “Love reproof to the man sitting in armchair” or “Happy marriage like hell…”

2004 – Given an academic rank of associate professor in the specialty “dramatic art” and “cinematography”

2005 – Kiev International festival of mono-performances “Vidlunnya” – awards in nominations “Best actress” and “Audience sympathy” for Gabriel Garcia Marques play “Love reproof to the man sitting in armchair” or “Happy marriage like hell…”

2006 – Honored Artist of Armenia

2008 – Given an academic rank of “professor” in the specialty “dramatic art” and “cinematography”

2012 – "Belaya Vezha" International Theatre festival in Brest – “Audience sympathy” for Karel Chapek play "The Mother"

References 
 Ամեն ինչ պետք է անենք, որպեսզի հայ ոգեղեն խոսքը վերածնունդ ապրի 1 August 2012
 Սերիալները հասարակությանը տանում են դեպի տգիտություն և անճաշակություն. Լալա Մնացականյան 26 July 2012
 Հրավիրել էր Լալա Մնացականյանը 31 August 2012

External links 

 Lala Mnatsakanyan on AV Production
 Lala Mnatsakanyan on Facebook

Living people
Armenian stage actresses
Armenian television actresses
1957 births